Elżbieta Gellner (born 3 February 1935) is a Polish former swimmer. She competed in the women's 100 metre backstroke at the 1956 Summer Olympics.

References

External links
 

1935 births
Living people
Olympic swimmers of Poland
Swimmers at the 1956 Summer Olympics
Sportspeople from Katowice
Polish female backstroke swimmers